The 1994-95 Azerbaijan Top League was the fourth season of the Azerbaijan Top League and was contested by 13 clubs with 2 points awarded for a win, 1 for a draw and no points were awarded for a defeat. Turan Tovuz were unable to defend their championship, with Kəpəz becoming the champions for the first time.

Khazar Lankaran withdrew from the league after the 12th round, their remaining matches were awarded 3–0 to the opposition. Nicat Maştağa changed their name to Bakı Fahlasi Maştağa.

Stadia and locations
Note: Table lists in alphabetical order.

League table

Results

Season statistics

Top scorers

References

External links
1994-95 RSSSF
APL Stats

Azerbaijan Premier League seasons
Azer
1994–95 in Azerbaijani football